About TKM Institute of Management

The TKM Institute of Management (TIM) is one of the most sought after B-Schools in Kerala and is ranked among the best Business Management Colleges in South India. Since 1995, TIM has been in the forefront of management education imparting world class knowledge to the participants. TIM which is run by TKM College Trust runs an MBA program which is approved by AICTE and affiliated to University of Kerala. MBA program of TKM Institute of Management which is accredited by National Board of Accreditation (NBA) is recognised by Multinational Companies across the world. The recruiters to TIM include Nestle, Heinz, ITC, Microsoft, Axis Bank, HDFC Bank, Federal Bank, South Indian Bank, Colgate, Nerolac Paints etc. to name a few. The average salary of MBA participants in 2018-19 stood at Rs.3.6 lakhs and the highest salary was Rs.9.6 lakhs (CTC). TKM Institute of Management has a very strong alumni base with around 2000 alumni spread across the world. 24 Batches of MBA program of TIM have successfully passed out of the campus and are doing well in the Corporate world.

References

External links

Business schools in Kerala
Universities and colleges in Kollam district
Colleges affiliated to the University of Kerala